Corynophora argentifascia is a moth in the family Crambidae. It was described by George Hampson in 1919. It is found in Australia, where it has been recorded from Western Australia.

References

Crambinae
Moths described in 1919